Austin Allen may refer to:
Austin Allen (quarterback) (born 1994), American football player
Austin Allen (baseball) (born 1994), American baseball player
Austin Allen (tight end) (born 1998), American football player
 Austin Allen (1901–1959), American country musician and member of The Allen Brothers